Shanquella Brenada Robinson (January 9, 1997 – October 29, 2022) was an American businesswoman, founder of a women's fashion clothing line, hairstylist and social media personality from North Carolina, United States, who was murdered while on vacation in Mexico.

She died on October 29, 2022, shortly after travelling with a friend and a group of loose acquaintances to the Mexican resort town of Cabo San Lucas.

There was considerable public interest and intrigue surrounding the cause of her death. In addition, substantial collaborative efforts of citizen journalism and amateur news bloggers played an important role in bringing attention to Robinson's death, to the point of Mexican authorities facing enhanced scrutiny, particularly because the municipal Police Department initially treated the death as a case of conventional tourist alcohol intoxication.

A video later surfaced which showed Robinson being attacked in a rental villa prior to her death.

The circumstances leading to her mysterious death, as well as the medical treatment, police report, and forensic inquiries into the cause of her untimely passing, have led to an ongoing high-profile, transnational criminal investigation within the United States and Mexico.

Background 

Robinson was a graduate of the historically black college Winston-Salem State University. She ran several boutique beauty and children's hair-braiding businesses, under her "Exquisite Kids" and "Exquisite Boutique" brands, in her hometown of Charlotte, North Carolina.

On October 28, 2022, Robinson travelled to Mexico for a short vacation with a friend and five travel companions: 3 women and 3 men, some of whom have been identified as Khalil Cooke, Malik St Patrick Dyer, Wenter Essence Donovan, Alysse Michelle Hyatt, Daejhanae Jackson, Nazeer Wiggins.

The group checked into a rental luxury apartment in the Puerto Los Cabos resort, at the resort town of Cabo San Lucas, Mexico.

Death 

On October 29, a day after the group's arrival, at around 2:13 p.m., a doctor from the American Medical Centre, Cabo San Lucas was requested because a resident at the resort was feeling unwell.

At around the same time, Shanquella's mother, Salamondra Robinson, received a phone call from one of her daughter's travel companions saying that her daughter had taken ill and that a doctor was on the way to tend to her welfare.

Dr. Karolina Beatriz Ornelas-Gutiérrez from the American Medical Centre arrived within an hour and found "a female in stable condition but dehydrated, disorientated, verbally unresponsive, unable to communicate, and appearing to be intoxicated."

The explanation given to the doctor was that Robinson "drank a lot of alcohol." The doctor recommended that Robinson be admitted into the hospital, but her travel companions insisted she be treated in the apartment room.

During medical treatment, the doctor attempted to administer an IV-drip. However, Robinson's condition worsened when she suffered a tonic–clonic seizure (a stiffening of the body, arms and legs), as well as a sphincter relaxation (spontaneous defecation), around 4:13 p.m., about one hour after the doctor’s arrival. An ambulance was called around 4:20 pm after Robinson began having trouble breathing, with her pulse dropping as well. Robinson then suffered a cardiac arrest.

Ambulant paramedics called to the scene around 4:49 pm tried to resuscitate Robinson, administering fourteen CPR rounds of cardiac-vascular compressions and intrathoracic pressure to her chest, in an attempt to (re-)establish venous blood-oxygen saturation and blood flow, as well as injecting five doses of adrenaline and six electrical discharges from a defibrillator. However, they were unable to revive any return of heartbeat, pulse, blood flow, pupillary reflexes or other human vital signs.

Shanquella Robinson was declared clinically dead at 5:57 pm, according to the police report.

Police report 
Police officers "Omar" and "David" of the Los Cabos Municipal Police Department were the two first responding officers at the scene around 5:25 pm. They were briefed by Dr. Ornelas-Gutiérrez, who informed the officers that medical treatment was requested for a young lady who had ingested "too much alcohol." She briefed the officers that she had found a female in stable but unresponsive condition, and that she had planned to admit her to hospital on an IV-line, which her travel companions objected to, claiming they instead requested that the young lady be treated in the hotel room, after which her condition worsened, even after arrival of ambulant paramedics.

After Robinson was declared dead, the investigating police officers notified the General Prosecutors Office (attorney general) in the state of Baja California Sur, reaching state attorney Julio Daniel around 6:35 pm and informing him of the death of a foreign citizen. They were instructed to file reports and investigation forms before handing the case to ministerial police.

Based on eyewitness accounts and after consultation with Dr. Ornelas-Gutiérrez, the police report concluded that a "deceased person (cardiopulmonary arrest)" had died of alcohol poisoning, and that she died two hours and 45 minutes after the doctor was called to the residence. There was no observation of internal or external injuries in the police report.

Based on this police report and the investigations of the Mexican authorities, the US State Department initially released a statement reporting that "Mexican authorities said there was no clear evidence Robinson was murdered".

Coroner's report 

On November 5 a notarized English translation of Robinson's death certificate, based on an autopsy report from forensic doctor Rene A. Galvan-Oseguera from the Secretariat Of Health, Baja California Sur, dated November 4, 2022, was released.

The autopsy report described Robinson's death 15 minutes after suffering a severe spinal cord injury and an atlas luxation, which is a dislocation or separation of the skull base from the atlas bone, the first bone of the neck (spinal column).

The forensic doctor made following forensic observations in the official autopsy report. Date and time of death: October 29, 2022 – 15:00 p.m..

Cause of death: Severe Spinal Cord Injury and Atlas Luxation.

Approximate time between injury and death: 15 minutes

Situation, circumstance or reason in which the injury occurred: Person found unconscious in her living room.

Was it accidental or violent death? YesThe autopsy report mentioned neither cardiac arrest nor alcohol poisoning.

Investigation

U.S. Department of State 
On November 16, the U.S. Department of State responded they were aware of the incident, releasing following statement: "We are aware of these reports. Protecting the welfare of U.S. citizens overseas is among our top priorities. Out of respect for the privacy of those involved, we have no further comment at this time," the department stated.

Family's doubts of conflicting accounts 
As Salamondra Robinson, Shanquella's mother, disclosed during an ABC News Good Morning America interview, her family became suspicious of the claims of her daughter's travel companions after each one of them returned with a different story, and each story with inconsistencies.

Some of her travel companions claimed a "maid" found her unconscious; some reported they called a doctor, some saying the apartment concierge called the doctor, at first claiming Shanquella had died of alcohol poisoning and a few days later admitting that "there had been a fight, that she was fighting and she had been jumped".

Regarding the location where Robinson was found unconscious, her travel associates raised further confusion and scepticism, when one told her mother they found Shanquella unconscious on the floor, another one claimed they found her in a bed, while another travel companion simultaneously told her father, Bernard Robinson, that they had found her in a chair.

Shanquella's mother told CBS News during an interview that her daughter's loose acquaintances initially suggested her daughter had taken ill from alcohol poisoning, a diagnosis which surprised her, since a doctor had not even arrived at that time, and since she had been told that a doctor was just on the way to their apartment.

She remarked how she suggested that her daughter be taken to an emergency room, but her daughter's travel companions had lied to her, claiming her daughter's travel insurance was of no use in Mexico and that the emergency room required $5,000 in cash for her daughter to be seen.

She recalled how further doubts began to surface, when the autopsy report emerged, showing the cause of death a broken neck, instead of alcohol poisoning.

During an interview with Queen City News, Ms Robinson also said her daughter's body showed obvious signs of trauma, a knot on her head, a bruised face, swollen eye and a busted lip after it was repatriated on November 12, ahead of Shanquella Robinson's November 19 funeral service which was held at the Macedonia Baptist Church in Charlotte, North Carolina.

For more than two weeks the family attempted convincing authorities in the United States and in Mexico, that their daughter's death was suspicious, deserving further investigation.

In a statement by Robinson's family published to GoFundMe (a crowdfunding page raising funds for the family's legal fees), Robinson's sister Quilla Long, announced the family will continue to investigate what happened:  "The United States State Department released a statement claiming "no clear evidence of foul play," yet there is a video circulating of a woman violently attacking Shanquella," Long said. "This statement is unacceptable, and we are beyond devastated. We continue to fight for the truth."

Local journalists first reporting on this case 
A journalist from the regional, Baja California Sur news chronicle Metropoli.Mx started covering the killing of Robinson, in the wake of American, 73-year-old retiree Rodney Davis, who was kidnapped while hiking and camping on the out-and-back trail of Loreto-Juncalito, Baja California Sur, murdered, found dead and DNA identified by the local police.

In mid November 2022, Mexican Journalists covering that case were tipped off by local police that another American tourist, Shanquella Robinson, had been killed 4 days after Rodney Davis was murdered, and started hearing rumors about a video of the incident being shared among Winston-Salem students.

Leaked video  
Beginning with a video of the incident being uploaded to Twitter, a wave of viral cellphone footage began surfacing on several social media outlets, of a bare naked African-American woman being viciously beaten by one of her female acquaintances in a bedroom of their vacation rental.

Salamondra Robinson confirmed that it was her daughter being beaten in the video.

In the video, an attacker in frenzied rage, begins to viciously punch Robinson; lobbing a series of relentless fist jabs to her head, beating her from one side of a large hotel bed, to another corner of the bed, while violently yanking her neck, throwing the victim unto the floor, delivering further furious blows to her face and kicking her head with her knee, before stumbling back to the other side of the room, ending her assault on Robinson.

There were at least two other people present during the altercation. A male filmed the assault and another person filmed the male capturing the event. The footage included a male who can be heard recommending to Robinson: "Quella? Can you at least fight back? At least sum`in?", to which Robinson responded "No!", indicating that she was not interested in fighting.

The video, which was received with shock, incredulity and revulsion on social media networks, subsequently raised questions about why, not only nobody intervened in the beating of a naked "friend", certainly most noteworthy the brutal beating of a naked woman in the middle of a hotel room, but instead chose to record the beating on a cellphone.

Voices in the media have also called into question, why suspects or witnesses in a femicide or homicide investigation were freely allowed to return to the United States without any arrests or interrogation.

Second State Attorney General investigation 
On November 16, the State Attorney General's Office of Baja California Sur reopened their investigation into Robinson's death as a possible femicide, confirming investigators have revisited the crime scene and were collecting "more evidence to achieve the accurate clarification of the events".

In a statement released to the press they disclosed: "The State Attorney General’s Office (PGJE) of Baja California Sur carries out the field and cabinet proceedings to clarify the facts in which a female person of foreign origin lost her life, on October 29, in a beach club in San José del Cabo.

It is reported that last Saturday, October 29,at approximately 6:15 p.m., he received a call from a public security element who reported that, in a house in the Fundadores Beach Club subdivision, in San José del Cabo, there was a woman without life.

State criminal investigation agents moved to the scene, where the first investigations were carried out under the corresponding protocols.

Experts from the Directorate of Expert Services, carried out the processing of the place, looking for clues that will be attached to the investigation folder.

The PGJE maintains the lines of investigation to collect more evidence to achieve the accurate clarification of the facts, without ruling out any hypothesis".According to the local Newspaper, authorities are also investigating the actions of the doctor, two officers of the local police force and the investigating state attorney with regards to negligence, official misconduct and dereliction of duties, as part of their inquiry.

FBI Investigation 
On November 18, the Federal Bureau of Investigation (FBI) field office in Charlotte, North Carolina, confirmed "it has also opened an investigation in the death of Charlotte resident, Shanquella Robinson in Cabo San Lucas, Mexico, on or about October 29, 2022. Due to the ongoing investigation, we have no further comment".

"Our investigation is completely separate from Mexico, I am not privy to anything they are doing", a spokesperson added.

A group of agents from the FBI's Charlotte Field Office were reportedly seen at the crime scene in Los Cabos, according to local news reports.

Criminal charge of Femicide 
On November 23, Daniel de la Rosa Anaya, Attorney General of Baja California General Prosecutors Office, announced an arrest court order relating to a femicide had been issued against a person identified as an American, the "direct aggressor" in the death of Shanquella Robinson.

During a video interview with local newspaper BCS Noticias, he clarified the cause of death, stating that Robinson did not die from alcohol intake or injuries sustained in a fight, but rather from a "direct assault", causing a spinal cord fracture.

The Prosecutors' Office had approached Mexican federal prosecutors and US officials to "carry out all relevant procedures [...] issuing an Interpol Red Alert to locate the suspect in the United States" and "working on formal extradition proceedings to extradite the suspect back to Mexico".

The Governor of Baja California Sur, Víctor Manuel Castro Cosío echoed the same sentiments. He reflected upon the beginnings of the investigation when "he had not the precise data on that occasion, and that it had initially been reported as an accident in a hotel, but then the investigation turned out it was not, but rather a femicide".

Local news reported that an arrest warrant had been issued for one of Robinson's travel companions, but to date no one has been officially charged.

See also 
 Femicide in Mexico
 Violence against women in Mexico
 List of United States crime-related lists
 Murder of Maria Lauterbach – An eight months pregnant United States Marine who was killed, by a fellow (Mexican born) US Marine, whom she had accused of rape, and whom the Federal Bureau of Investigation (FBI), the Naval Criminal Investigative Service (NCIS), the Judge Advocate General (JAG) and the Interpol extradited back from Mexico to the United States in a two-year-long extradition procedure, ahead of his sentencing to life in prison.
 Death of Tamla Horsford – An African-American woman who died at a "Soccer moms" sleepover. 
 Murder of Meredith Kercher – A British citizen killed during a vacation in Italy.
 Malcolm Shabazz – An African-American tourist and grandson of Malcolm X killed in Mexico.
 Murder of Ashley Ann Olsen – An American killed by an acquaintance during an Italy vacation.

Notes
 It remains unclear whether coroner meant to select "Yes: it was accidental" or "Yes: it was a violent death".
 It is also unclear if the doctor treating Robinson was aware Robinson had sustained a broken neck, and if she was able to make any material diagnosis relating to neck injuries within the confines of a hotel room.
 An injury that often occurs when a persons head is violently yanked or twisted away from the neck.

References 

American people murdered abroad
People murdered in Mexico
Murder in Mexico
2022 deaths
October 2022 events in Mexico
Deaths by person in Mexico
1997 births
Femicide in Mexico